Men of Tomorrow is a 1959 British short feature starring Vernon Greeves and David Hemmings. It was directed by Alfred Travers.

Cast
Vernon Greeves as Bill Hanley
Janet Smith as Helen
David Hemmings as Ted

References

External links

Men of Tomorrow at BFI

1959 films
British short films
Films directed by Alfred Travers
1950s English-language films